Fort Tanjong Katong, which stood from 1879 to 1901, was one of the oldest military forts built by the former British colonial government of Singapore. The fort gave its name to today's Fort Road, and it used to stand on the grounds of the present Katong Park. Fort Tanjong Katong, the only one of its kind on the eastern side of the island, was part of a series of defensive batteries and fortifications along the southern coast of Singapore, that defended the eastern approaches to the Singapore Harbour and Singapore Town against seaborne attacks. Due to its poor structural design and remoteness, the fort was subsequently abandoned and buried until its rediscovery in 2001. Found with traces of a moat and near intact perimeter wall, the fort was considered by local archaeological experts as one of Singapore's most important archaeological finds of a "true 19-century fort" to date. As a result, an archaeology group has been lobbying for the site to be gazetted as a National Monument. As of May 2010, the National Heritage Board has stated that it has no plans to gazette the fort for the time being.

History

Fort Tanjong Katong was designed and built in 1879 by Henry Edward McCallum, who was the Colonial Engineer and Architect of the Singapore History Museum on Stamford Road. The fort reflected the British concerns that other European powers such as the Netherlands and Russia, might attack the strategically located colony founded by Sir Stamford Raffles of the British East India Company in 1819. On the island of Sentosa, Fort Siloso, Fort Connaught, Fort Serapong and Imbiah Battery were built around the same time as Fort Tanjong Katong, to guard the western and eastern entrances to the New Harbour (now Keppel Harbour).

The fort was sitting atop a wet, low-lying coconut plantation and occupied an area of approximately two hectares, and had a small elevated battery of three  rifled muzzle-loading guns facing the sea, along with bombproof shelters. The battery was surrounded by a ditch measuring 100 feet wide on the flanks. A local team of contractors constructed the fort in less than 12 months. The fort's garrison included members of the Singapore Volunteer Artillery (SVA) that held regular gun drills and their annual training camps at the fort. In 1885, works began on upgrading the existing gun batteries in Singapore, and the three-gun battery at Tanjong Katong was replaced with a pair of more powerful and longer range Mark VII  breech-loading guns.

"Wash-out Fort"
Beset by problems from the start, the Fort Tanjong Katong was nicknamed the "Wash-out Fort". Due to the soft ground, each time the guns were fired, the range finding equipment would shake, and would need to be recalibrated. To make matters worse, it was difficult to find the ammunition for the new  guns as it was not common in Singapore. The remoteness of the site, which hindered supply and reinforcement, reduced the effectiveness of Fort Tanjong Katong as a defensive position.

Barely five years after upgrades were completed in 1888, it was suggested the fort be demolished. Debates over the fort lingered on between the Colonial Defence Committee in London, and the Local Defence Committee in Singapore for nearly a decade. The fort was finally rendered obsolete and abandoned in 1901 when the guns were removed. Instead of destroying the fort, the British thought it simpler to bury it, which was done sometime after World War I. A portion of a bastion was still visible above ground well into the 1960s, when a public park was built atop the fort for the fast-growing Katong suburbs. In the late 1960s, the bastion was finally buried when land reclamation in the East Coast took place, and its memory was soon forgotten in the ensuing decades.

Rediscovery
In 2001, the outline of the top of the bastion wall became visible during a dry spell; this prompted a Katong resident, Jack Sim, to seek out the relevant authorities to investigate its origins. Despite much public discussion and interest generated by the discovery, it was not until in 2004 that the Singapore government finally approached a team of archaeologists to excavate the forgotten fort. The excavation was made possible by a community-based project named "Raising History, Planting Roots", that was initiated by the Mountbatten Citizens' Consultative Committee with local residents and schools as a community involvement program to encourage ownership of local heritage. In just four weeks, an amount of S$200,000 (US$120,000) was raised from corporate sponsors and a fund-raising dinner, held at Suntec City Mall on 27 September 2004. Senior Minister Goh Chok Tong, a Member of Parliament for Marine Parade Group Representation Constituency, was the guest of honour at the event.

The long-awaited excavation began on 29 September 2004, led by a handful of archaeologists and dedicated archaeology volunteers called Southeast Asian Archaeology. Nearly 2 metres down, the volunteers uncovered significant remains of the fort still in situ—a pair of infantry bastions that did not appear in the original plans, the perimeter of the moat's inner escarpment and what appears to be the drawbridge superstructure. Experts call it Singapore's only 'true fort'—one with protection all around—and it was considered one of Singapore's most important archaeological finds.

The archaeological dig at the former Fort Tanjong Katong site, provided a unique opportunity for many like-minded Singaporeans to participate actively in uncovering the remains of the old fort. For nearly 10 months, more than 1,000 volunteers ranging from school students to housewives, retirees, working professionals on their off-days assisted the archaeologists on site and discovering first hand on the 125-year-old military fort.

The Raffles Museum of Biodiversity Research, a natural history research unit of the National University of Singapore, assisted with the analysis of marine artefacts and corals that were uncovered at the site, and some 36 bags of samples have been deposited with the museum for further analysis. A Preliminary Site Report (dated 7 May 2006) was later compiled and submitted to the relevant authorities which outlined the research process, preliminary findings, variety of volunteers, and a list of the archaeology research team involved.

Reburied again
To date, the excavation project at Fort Tanjong Katong has ended and only the south-eastern bastion, which was nearly fully excavated, has been cordoned off indefinitely (the south-western bastion was left untouched). Except for the cordoned off bastion, other exposed fort remains were reburied again in December 2005 by the National Parks Board, which runs the park, to protect them against the elements for future archaeologists to discover. It was also done because the dug-out pits could well breed mosquitoes; there were also fears that someone might fall into one of the 2 m-deep holes. The remaining funds, about S$150,000, were ploughed back into bursaries and scholarships for the constituency's students.

The archaeology group is lobbying for the site to be gazetted as a National Monument, and to incorporate the fort remains to be featured as part of the park in future. To date, its status is still pending while waiting for the final decision by the Preservation of Monuments Board and the Urban Redevelopment Authority.

References

External links
Picture gallery of Fort Tanjong Katong excavation in 2004
MICA—Parliamentary question #216 on the status of Fort Tanjong Katong dated 22 May 2007

Government buildings completed in 1879
Tanjong Katong
Military of Singapore under British rule
Coastal fortifications
19th-century architecture in Singapore